Security characteristic line (SCL) is a regression line, plotting performance of a particular security or portfolio against that of the market portfolio at every point in time. The SCL is plotted on a graph where the Y-axis is the excess return on a security over the risk-free return and the X-axis is the excess return of the market in general. The slope of the SCL is the security's beta, and the intercept is its alpha.

Formula

where:
αi is called the asset's alpha (abnormal return)
βi(RM,t – Rf) is a nondiversifiable or systematic risk
εi,t is the non-systematic or diversifiable, non-market or idiosyncratic risk
RM,t is the return to market portfolio
Rf is a risk-free rate

See also
 Security market line
 Capital allocation line
 Capital market line
 Modern portfolio theory

References

External links
Security characteristic line calculator
CAPM and the Characteristic Line
Chapter 7 CAPM {link doesn't work}
Chapter 13 {link doesn't work}

Investment